The Brown Bear is a pub at 139 Leman Street, Whitechapel, London E1.

It is a Grade II listed building, dating back to the early 19th century.

References

External links
 

Grade II listed pubs in London
Pubs in the London Borough of Tower Hamlets
Grade II listed buildings in the London Borough of Tower Hamlets